Marion Meadows is an American soprano saxophonist and composer, mainly in smooth jazz. He was born in West Virginia and grew up mainly in Connecticut. His first album as a leader was For Lovers Only in 1990. He has had several other commercially successful releases, considerable exposure on smooth jazz radio, and has toured internationally.

Discography
 For Lovers Only (1990)
 Keep It Right There (1992)
 Forbidden Fruit (1994)
 Body Rhythm (1995)
 Pleasure (1997)
 Another Side of Midnight (1999)
 Next To You (2000)
 In Deep (2002)
 Player's Club (2004)
 Dressed to Chill (2006)
 Secrets (2009)
 Whisper (2013)
 Soul Traveler (2015)
 Soul City (2018)
 Christmas With You (2019)
 Twice as Nice (2021)

References

External links
 
 Design page
 Art page

Living people
American jazz tenor saxophonists
American male saxophonists
American jazz soprano saxophonists
Smooth jazz saxophonists
Heads Up International artists
Novus Records artists
Musicians from West Virginia
Musicians from Stamford, Connecticut
21st-century American saxophonists
Jazz musicians from Connecticut
21st-century American male musicians
American male jazz musicians
Year of birth missing (living people)